Sir Stuart Anthony Lipton (born 9 November 1942) is a British property developer, a founder of Stanhope plc, and the co-founder of the property company Chelsfield with Elliott Bernerd, and now a co-founder (with Peter Rogers) and partner in Lipton Rogers Developments LLP.

Early life
Stuart was born in 1942 to a Jewish family, the son of Bertram Green and Jeanette Lipton (née Lipton). He was educated at Berkhamsted School. His mother cofounded, with her brother Gerald Lipton MBE, the retailer Chinacraft in 1951.

Career
Lipton is responsible for over 20 million sq ft of development in London, including Broadgate, Stockley Park and Chiswick Business Park.

Stuart is Deputy Chairman of Chelsfield Partners  and as of 2015, through his property company Lipton Rogers, is developing 22 Bishopsgate, which will be the tallest skyscraper in the City of London.

Stuart is on the London Finance Commission for the Mayor of London, is a Director of the National Gallery Trust Foundation, and a Trustee of the Royal Opera House Endowment Fund. He has been recognised as an Honorary Fellow Imperial College, an Honorary Bencher Inner Temple, with an Honorary Doctorate (LL.D.) University of Bath and an Honorary Doctorate of Engineering University College London. He was the Edward Bass Visiting Architecture Fellow, at Yale School of Architecture in 2006 and Chairman of the City Finance Commission in 2011.

Stuart was honoured in the Queen's birthday honours receiving a knighthood in 2000.

Personal life
He has been married to Ruth since 1966.

Their sons Elliot Lipton and Grant Lipton run their own property companies, First Base. and Great Marlborough Estates.

Their daughter Sarah Doll-Steinberg is a certified ADHD and executive function education coach, and is married to Daniel Doll-Steinberg, son of Alfred Doll-Steinberg.

References

1942 births
Living people
British Jews
People educated at Berkhamsted School
British businesspeople
Businesspeople awarded knighthoods
Knights Bachelor